The Air Navigation Act 1920 was an Act of Parliament of the United Kingdom Parliament in 1920 which gave the British government the authority to control air navigation.

An identically named Act was passed by the Commonwealth Parliament in Australia, to bring into force the provision of the Paris Convention and the newly created International Commission for Air Navigation (ICAN).

History of the Act
The first attempts at international regulation of air navigation were made in 1910 in Paris, when representatives of 19 European countries attended an International Air Conference. The meeting was abandoned when agreement on the contents could not be reached. At a peace conference after World War I the regulation of air navigation was once again discussed. Because of the advances made in aviation during the war, all attending members agreed to hold an International Conference to draw up rules and international regulations for air traffic. The Paris Convention was signed on 13 October 1919.

On 25 February 1919, an Australian Air Traffic Committee under the Council of Defence met for the first time. 

Major General Legge, Chairman of the Committee, noted that "there should be only one regulatory air authority for Australia, working under a single legislature." At a Australian Premiers’ Conference in May 1920 the Australian Prime Minister Billy Hughes's recommendation that "each State should refer to the Commonwealth [of Australia] the control of air navigation, but in a way as to reserve to the States the right to own and use aircraft for the purpose of government departments and the police powers of the State" was carried, and the Australian Parliament passed the Air Navigation Act in the widest possible terms.

The Australian Air Navigation Act of 1920 was granted assent on 2 December 1920, gazetted on 11 February 1921, came into force on 28 March 1921 and became law on 28 June 1921. Regulations under the Act provided for the registration of aircraft, licensing of aerodromes, licensing of personnel, periodic inspection and maintenance of aircraft, and rules of the air.

List of Acts and adaptions

See also 

 Aerodrome
 Civil Aviation Safety Authority
 Chicago Convention on International Civil Aviation

References 

Australia
Aviation in Australia
Aviation history of the United Kingdom
Aviation law
International Civil Aviation Organization treaties
Treaties concluded in 1919
1919 in aviation
1919 in France
League of Nations treaties
Transport legislation